"Miss America" is a song by American rock band Saving Abel, released in 2011 as the third single from their second album Miss America (2010).

Track listing
Digital single
"Miss America" (radio mix) — 3:18

Charts

Release history

References

2010 songs
Saving Abel songs
Virgin Records singles
Songs written by Marti Frederiksen
Songs written by Skidd Mills